Sir William Leman, 2nd Baronet (19 December 1637 – 18 July 1701) was an English politician who sat in the House of Commons  from 1690 to 1695.

Leman was the son of Sir William Leman, 1st Baronet and his wife Rebecca Prescot, daughter  of Edward Prescot, of Thoby, in Essex, and of London. He inherited the baronetcy on the death of his father in 1667.

He was appointed High Sheriff of Hertfordshire for 1676–77. In 1690, Leman was elected Member of Parliament for Hertford and held the seat until 1695.

He developed Goodman's Fields, near Aldgate and now in East London. He used family names to identify the streets: alongside Leman Street he named Mansell Street after his wife's family, Prescot Street after that of his mother, and Ayliff/Alie Street after his daughter-in-law's family, Aley.

Leman died at his house at Northaw at the age of 63 and was succeeded by his grandson William. He had married Mary Mansell, daughter of Sir Lewis Mansell, 2nd Baronet of Margam in 1655.

References
Notes

Sources
 

1637 births
1701 deaths
English MPs 1690–1695
Baronets in the Baronetage of England
High Sheriffs of Hertfordshire
People from Northaw